The black-tailed bar-lipped skink (Glaphyromorphus nigricaudis)  is a species of skink found in Northern Territory and Queensland in Australia, Papua New Guinea and Indonesia.

References

Glaphyromorphus
Reptiles described in 1877
Taxa named by William John Macleay